Henry Eric Beissel (born 12 April 1929 Cologne) is a writer and editor who has published 24 volumes of poetry, six books of plays, a non-fiction book on Canada, two anthologies of plays intended for use in high schools, and numerous essays and pieces of short fiction.

Biography
Henry Beissel was born in Cologne, Germany, and survived the second World war as a youth. He came to Canada in 1951.

He first came to national attention with the controversial literary/political journal Edge (Edmonton 1963 – Montreal 1969).

Beissel's internationally successful Inuk and the Sun ("a mythic masterpiece", Sherrill Grace) premiered at the Stratford Festival of Canada in 1973. This was followed by a U.S. premiere in 1977 at The Other Theatre in Chicago's Bernard Horwich Jewish Community Center with a musical score by Douglas L. Lieberman. The Other Theatre also commissioned Under Coyote's Eye and performed it at the Field Museum of Natural History. Beissel's work has been translated into many languages.

Beissel had a long teaching career in English literature, and later in creative writing, which started as a teaching fellow at the University of Toronto. He taught at the University of Munich (1960–62), the University of Alberta (1962–64) and Concordia University (Montreal) (1966–96), from which he retired as distinguished emeritus professor of English.

He lives with his wife, Arlette Francière, in Ottawa.

Awards
Beissel has received several awards. The first was the Norma Epstein Award for Creative Writing in 1958 at University of Toronto, and the last was the Walter-Bauer Literaturpreis, Merseburg (Germany), 1994.

Selected bibliography
New Wings for Icarus. Toronto: Coach House, 1966. 
A Different Sun (poems by Walter Bauer translated from the German). Ottawa: Oberon, 1976.
Inuk and the Sun. Toronto: Gage, 1980. 
Under Coyote's Eye. Dunvegan, Ontario: Quadrant, 1980. 
Improvisations for Mr. X & the Noose. Dunvegan, Ontario: Cormorant, 1989.
Kanada. Romantik und Wirklichkeit (with photographs by Janis Kraulis). Innsbruck: Pinguin Verlag, 1981.
Cantos North. Moonbeam, Ontario: Penumbra, 1982.
Season of Blood. Toronto: Mosaic, 1984.
A Thistle In His Mouth (poems by Peter Huchel translated from the German). Dunvegan, Ontario: Cormorant Books, 1987.
The Noose & Improvisations for Mister X. Dunvegan, Ontario: Cormorant, 1989.
Dying I was Born. Waterloo, Ontario: Penumbra, 1992.
Stones to Harvest. Gooderich, Ontario: Moonstone, 1993.
Across the Sun's Warp. Ottawa: BuschekBooks, 2003.

Plays
The Curve, University of Alberta, 1963
A Trumpet For Nap, Little Angel Theatre, London, England. 1970
Are You Afraid of Thieves?, Universite du Quebec, 1973, La Troupe Brin'si
Inook And The Sun, The Stratford Festival, Canada, 1973
For Crying Out Loud, Char-Lan Theatre Workshop, Williamstown, Ontario. 1975
Goya, Montreal Theatre Lab, 1976
Under Coyote's Eye, Other Theatre, Chicago, 1978
The Emigrants, Saidye Bronfman Centre, Montreal. 1981
Hedda Gabler, Saidye Bronfman Centre, Montreal. 1982 (translation)
The Noose, University of Winnipeg, 1985The Glass Mountain'', University of Winnipeg, Manitoba. 1990

References

External links
 Settlement and Survival: Henry Beissel's 'Cantos North'
 Henry Beissel's website
 Peace Networking with Professor Beissel by Koozma J. Tarasoff, Spirit-Wrestlers Blog, 17 March 2018.  

1929 births
20th-century Canadian poets
20th-century Canadian male writers
Canadian male poets
21st-century Canadian poets
Living people
Academic staff of the University of Alberta
21st-century Canadian male writers